The following is a list of water parks in Oceania sorted by region.

Australia

Australian Capital Territory
 Big Splash, Canberra

New South Wales
 Jamberoo Action Park, Jamberoo
 Raging Waters Sydney, Prospect
 The Big Banana Fun Park, Coffs Harbour

Queensland
 Sugarworld
 Wet'n'Wild Gold Coast, Gold Coast
 WhiteWater World, Gold Coast (part of Dreamworld)

South Australia
 The Beachouse, Adelaide

Victoria
 Adventure Park, Geelong
 Funfields, Whittlesea
 Gumbuya World, Tyong

Western Australia
 Adventure World, Perth

New Zealand
 Aquatic Park Parakai Springs, Auckland
 Splash Planet, Hastings
 Taupo DeBretts Hot Springs, Taupō
 Waiwera Hot Pools, Auckland
 Waterworld, Hamilton

See also 
List of water parks
List of amusement parks in Oceania

References 

Lists of amusement parks
Oceania-related lists
Lists of tourist attractions in Oceania
Lists of buildings and structures in Oceania